Aly Farag is an Electrical and Biomedical Engineer. , he is a professor at the University of Louisville. He was named Fellow of the Institute of Electrical and Electronics Engineers (IEEE) in 2014 for contributions to image modeling and biomedical applications.

Education
Farag studied Electrical Engineering at Cairo University, earning a B.S. degree in 1976. He continued his studies at Cairo University, earning a diploma in Systems and Biomedical Engineering in 1979. He then earned master's degrees in Biomedical Engineering in 1981 from Ohio State University and Bioengineering in 1984 from University of Michigan before completing his education with a Ph.D. in Electrical Engineering from Purdue University in 1990.

Awards and recognition 
Farag has been Elected Fellow of IEEE and IAPR for contributions to Image Modeling and Biomedical Applications. Since January 2019, he has been elevated to the rank of Life IEEE Fellow.

Research

Selected publications

References 

Fellow Members of the IEEE
Living people
University of Louisville faculty
Cairo University alumni
Ohio State University College of Engineering alumni
University of Michigan College of Engineering alumni
Year of birth missing (living people)
Purdue University College of Engineering alumni
American electrical engineers